Puldinni (also spelled) Puladinni is a village in the Sindhanur taluk of Raichur district in the Indian state of Karnataka. Puldinni is located near to Pothnal stream joining Tungabhadra river. Puldinni lies on road connecting Pothnal-Ayanur.

Demographics
 India census, Puldinni had a population of 1,954 with 998 males and 956 females and 319 Households.

See also
Ayanur
Pothnal
Hedaginal
Olaballari
Sindhanur
Raichur

References

External links
raichur.nic.in

Villages in Raichur district